New Lebanon is an unincorporated community in Gill Township, Sullivan County, in the U.S. state of Indiana.

The community is part of the Terre Haute Metropolitan Statistical Area.

History
New Lebanon was founded in 1827, and was named after the biblical Mount Lebanon. A post office was established at New Lebanon in 1840, and remained in operation until it was discontinued in 1966.

Geography

References

Unincorporated communities in Sullivan County, Indiana
Unincorporated communities in Indiana
Terre Haute metropolitan area